The Journal of Adolescent and Young Adult Oncology is a bimonthly peer-reviewed medical journal covering oncology as it relates to adolescents and young adults. It was established in April 2011 and is published by Mary Ann Liebert, Inc. on behalf of the Society for Adolescent and Young Adult Oncology, of which it is the official journal. Since the journal first launched, its editor-in-chief has been Leonard Sender (Children's Hospital of Orange County). According to the Journal Citation Reports, the journal has a 2016 impact factor of 1.431.

References

External links

Publications established in 2011
Oncology journals
Mary Ann Liebert academic journals
English-language journals
Pediatrics journals
Bimonthly journals